Local Authority Accommodation is the name given to a form of Public housing provided in Ireland by various County Councils and City Corporations along with Urban District Councils. In Dublin, the most notable and visible example of local authority accommodation is the Ballymun Flats near Dublin Airport.

Estates of houses have been built around the country at various stages, typically to strict standards.

In 2006, the Irish Government budgeted just over €1 billion for social housing needs.

Housing in the Republic of Ireland
Public housing